Écoscience is a quarterly peer-reviewed scientific journal originally published by Université Laval (1994–2014), and by Taylor & Francis since 2015. It was founded by Serge Payette and it covers all aspects of ecology. In 2021 it had an impact factor of 1.344.

References

External links 
 

Ecology journals
Quarterly journals
Multilingual journals
Publications established in 1994
Taylor & Francis academic journals